Molltown is a small unincorporated community in central Berks County, Pennsylvania, United States. The village is located near Lake Ontelaunee and is located on Maidencreek Road, a back road in the area. It is part of the Fleetwood Area School District.

A post office called Molltown was established in 1839, and remained in operation until being discontinued in 1920. The community was named for the Moll family of settlers.

References

Unincorporated communities in Berks County, Pennsylvania
Unincorporated communities in Pennsylvania